The Railways Act 1993 (c 43) was introduced by John Major's Conservative government and passed on 5 November 1993. It provided for the restructuring of the British Railways Board (BRB), the public corporation that owned and operated the national railway system.  A few residual responsibilities of the BRB remained with BRB (Residuary) Ltd.

Background
While the administration of Margaret Thatcher had not done so, the Major government were determined to privatise British Rail. Railways in the 18th and 19th Centuries had originally been built and run with private capital, but subsidised heavily by Parliament and communities who gave land for building through compulsory purchase. Rail was increasingly regulated, for instance under the Railways Act 1921, but was finally nationalised by the Transport Act 1947. Calls for reform of the nationalised system combined with people who believed only the private sector could run rail to ensure better service for passengers at cheaper cost. This led to the Railways Act 1993.

Contents
The legislation created a new regulatory regime for the railways, with the establishment of the Rail Regulator (dealing with the monopoly and dominant elements of the industry, principally Railtrack (now Network Rail)) and the Director of Passenger Rail Franchising, whose role was to sell passenger rail franchises to the private sector.  The Director of Passenger Rail Franchising was replaced in 2001 by the Strategic Rail Authority. When the SRA was abolished in 2006 franchising were taken over by the Secretary of State for Transport. The statutory position of Rail Regulator was abolished in July 2004 and his functions were taken over by the Office of Rail Regulation.

Consequences
The legislation enabled the Secretary of State for Transport John MacGregor to transfer separated parts of the railway to the private sector. Passenger rail services were franchised to private companies including Virgin Rail Group, Connex and the coach companies Stagecoach and National Express, and the national railway track and signalling company Railtrack was floated on the London Stock Exchange in 1996.  British Rail's track maintenance and renewal operations were sold to private companies, with contracts to provide infrastructure services to Railtrack.  The three rolling stock leasing companies or ROSCOs, owners of the passenger rolling stock, were sold to management buyout teams.

Railtrack
Railtrack collapsed in highly controversial circumstances in October 2001, and in October 2002 the company emerged from railway administration, a special state of insolvency for railway companies created by the Railways Act 1993, as Network Rail.  Some commentators regard the creation of Network Rail and its taking maintenance in-house as the beginning of the reversal of rail privatisation.

Amendments
The legislation has been amended several times, most significantly by the Transport Act 2000, the Railways and Transport Safety Act 2003 and the Railways Act 2005.

See also
 Railways Act 1921
 Transport Act 1947

References

Railway Acts
United Kingdom Acts of Parliament 1993
1993 in rail transport
Transport policy in the United Kingdom
Privatisation of British Rail
November 1993 events in the United Kingdom